On Your Toes is a 1927 American silent comedy film directed by Fred C. Newmeyer and starring Reginald Denny, Barbara Worth and Hayden Stevenson. It was part of a trend of sports films produced at various Hollywood studios at the time.

Synopsis
Needing to find a new contender to fight the heavyweight champion who has insulted him, a New York fight promotor travels south to Virginia to recruit the son of an ex-champion only to find that he is running a dance school.

Cast
 Reginald Denny as Elliott Beresford
 Barbara Worth as Mary Sullivan
 Hayden Stevenson as Jack Sullivan
 Frank Hagney as Mello
 Mary Carr as 	Grandmother
 Gertrude Howard as Mammy
 George West as Mose

References

Bibliography
 Solomon, Aubrey. The Fox Film Corporation, 1915-1935: A History and Filmography. McFarland, 2011.

External links
 

1927 films
1927 comedy films
1920s sports comedy films
1920s English-language films
American silent feature films
American sports comedy films
Films directed by Fred C. Newmeyer
Universal Pictures films
American boxing films
Films set in Virginia
Films set in New York City
1920s American films
Silent American comedy films
Silent sports comedy films